Valerian Stan (born 1955) is a Romanian publicist, civic and human rights activist, dignitary, lawyer, and military officer.

Education and career
He was born in Sascut, Bacău County. In 1977, Stan graduated the Nicolae Bălcescu Military School of active infantry officers from Sibiu. At graduation he received the rank of lieutenant and was assigned to a military unit in Bucharest. For nearly eight years he served as platoon and companion commander. Subsequently, until the end of 1989, he held administrative positions in the fields of logistics and labor protection, including within military construction units in the "national economy". Between 1982 and 1987, he attended the courses of the Faculty of Law at the University of Bucharest.

After the Romanian Revolution of December 1989, he was a publicist, one of the leaders of the Civic Alliance, and he worked in human rights and think-tank organizations (APADOR-CH, CRJ, IPP, etc.). Between December 1996 and August 1997, he was state secretary, chief of Government's Department (GCD), within the government of Victor Ciorbea. The investigations he coordinated in this position uncovered several irregularities of some high officials affiliated to the governmental coalition (the questionable selling of part of the navy's property, the  Flota-Fleet dossier, "Petroklav"/Traian Băsescu and others, the occupancy or the illegal appropriation of several residences from the state's special locative fund, etc.) This fact finally led to Stan's dismissal from the position – a decision that later was considered as a mistake by Prime Minister Ciorbea and Minister Băsescu. In subsequent years, this measure had serious consequences in the fight against corruption in Romania.

References
 Cronica română, 11 April 1997, "Dificultățile perioadei următoare vor fi suportate numai dacă va exista certitudinea că se face dreptate", interview by Ana Blandiana
 Adevărul, 7 July 1997: "Dovezile clare aduse de Valerian Stan – primite de miniștri cu degetele în urechi" and editorial by Cristian Tudor Popescu "Guvernul conduce reforma pe ultimul drum"
 Revista 22, 8–14 July 1997, "Compromis la Guvern/ Valerian Stan – Casele, demnitarii și demnitatea"
 România Liberă, 19 July 1997, "Lista lui Stan/ Moșierii nu mai vin, i-a făcut regimul Iliescu/ 11.000 de hectare de terenuri agricole luate cu japca doar în 4 județe"
 România Liberă, 26 August, editorial by Octavian Paler "Bizareriile d-lui Ciorbea"
 Evenimentul Zilei, 28 August 1997, "Prin demiterea lui Valerian Stan, Guvernul rade incoruptibilii"
 Adevărul, 28 August 1997, "Monstruoasa coaliție l-a demis pe Valerian Stan", editorial by Adrian Ursu
 România Liberă, 3 September 1997, editorial by Petre Mihai Băcanu "Dreptatea e un risc?"
 România Liberă, 11 September 1997, Gabriela Adameșteanu, "Valerian Stan la Porţile Orientului"
 Curentul, 11 January 2000, Ștefan Augustin Doinaș, "Morala politicii şi politica moralei"

External links

1955 births
University of Bucharest alumni
Living people
People from Bacău County
Romanian activists
Romanian civil servants
Romanian textbook writers
Eastern Orthodox Christians from Romania
Members of the Romanian Orthodox Church
Romanian human rights activists
Romanian public relations people
Romanian jurists